Bandhan – Saari Umar Humein Sang Rehna Hai is an Indian television drama show, which premiered on 16 September 2014 and aired on Zee TV until 17 April 2015.  it replaced Ek Mutthi Aasmaan  in its timeslot. Bandhan is the story of a little girl, Darpan, and her adopted brother, Ganesh the elephant. 
The show took a 10 year leap in the episode of 27 January 2015. Darpan marries a misguided man, Raghav, and must defeat the person who destroyed her family, Vishwasrao Patil. Can she do this?
Bandhan tells the story of a bond between human and animal.

Cast 
Ananya Agarwal/Chhavi Pandey as Darpan Karnik/Riya Khare
Mrunal Jain as Raghavendra Patil/Sameer Sen
Sudesh Berry as Vishwasrao Tagdu Patil
Aditya Redij as Mahesh Karnik 
Shweta Munshi as Prabha Mahesh Karnik 
Gracy Goswami/Priyanka Purohit as Pinky Patil
Unknown/Ashish Mehrotra as Sanjay Patil
Meenal Pendse/Sunila Karambelkar as Meethi Patil
Monica Bedi as Narayani Deshpande 
Sushmita Mukherjee as Shakuntala Apte
Anirudh Dave as Dev Pratap Patil
Snigdha Akolkar as Kajri Patil
Bhanujeet Sudan as Surya Pratap Patil
Piyali Munshi as Sheetal Patil
Meenu Panchal as Kajal
Shubhi Ahuja as Payal 
Suman Shashi Kant as Devi
Ravi Mishra as Dr. Ayush

Abuse of elephant 
The makers of the show have been facing opposition from Animal Welfare Board of India (AWBI) and animal rights organization, PETA India for abusing baby elephant, Suman, who is a central character in the show. According to media reports, AWBI and PETA conducted an inspection and found out that elephant, Suman, was treated poorly on the sets. Suman had developed skin infection and exhibited abnormal behaviour. Handlers also reportedly threatened her with sticks in front of the inspectors and she was not provided with adequate access to drinking water, appropriate housing or necessary veterinary care. 
Suman, the baby elephant, is three years old and separating her from her mother has been called 'unethical' by PETA.

According to a news published in Times of India, AWBI has canceled the permission to use the animal after which makers of the show went to Bombay High Court. The case is under sub-judice.

PETA India has urged High Court to rehabilitate Suman to a sanctuary.

References

External links 

 

Zee TV original programming
2014 Indian television series debuts
2015 Indian television series endings
Hindi-language television shows
Indian television soap operas
Television series about elephants
Swastik Productions television series